Massachusetts's 10th congressional district was a small district that included parts of the South Shore of Massachusetts, and all of Cape Cod and the islands. The district had existed since 1795, but was removed for the 113th Congress in 2013 as district lines were redrawn to accommodate the loss of the seat due to reapportionment as a result of the 2010 census. Effective from the elections of 2012, most of the former district falls into the new Massachusetts 9th congressional district, with some northern portions falling in the new 8th district.

Cities and towns in the district prior to 2013

1840s
1843: "The Counties of Barnstable, Dukes, and Nantucket, together with the towns of Rochester and Wareham, in the County of Plymouth, and of Dartmouth, Fairhaven, and New Bedford, in the County of Bristol."

1860s
1869: "Berkshire and Hampden counties."

1870s–1880s

1890s–1950s
1893: Boston, Wards 13, 14, 15, 19 (Precincts 1, 5, 7, 8, 9), 20, 22, 24; Milton, Quincy.

1916: Boston, Wards 1, 2, 3, 4, 5, 6, 7, 8, 9, 11 (Precincts 1, 2).

1921: Boston, Wards 1, 2, 3, 4, 5, 6.

1934: Boston, Wards 4, 5, 9, 10, 11, 12, 19, 20, 21.

1941–1953: Boston, Wards 4, 5, 10, 12, 19, 20, 21; Brookline, Newton.

1960s–1970s
1963: "Bristol County: Cities of Attleboro, Fall River, and Taunton. Towns of Berkley, Dighton, Easton, Freetown, Mansfield, North Attleboro, Norton, Raynham, Rehoboth, Seekonk, Somerset, and Swansea. Middlesex County: City of Newton. Norfolk County: Towns of Dover, Foxborough, Medfield, Needham, Norfolk, Plainville, Walpole, Wellesley, Westwood, and Wrentham."

1977: "Bristol County: Cities of Attleboro, Fall River, and Taunton. Towns of Berkley, Dighton, Easton, Freetown, Mansfield, North Attleborough, Norton, Raynham, Rehoboth, Seekonk, Somerset, Swansea, and Westport. Middlesex County: Towns of Natick and Sherborn. Norfolk County: Towns of Foxborough, Medfield, Millis, Norfolk, Plainville, Sharon, Wellesley, and Wrentham. Plymouth County: Towns of Bridgewater, East Bridgewater, Halifax, Hanson, Lakeville, Middleborough, and West Bridgewater."

1990s
1997: "Counties: Barnstable, Dukes, Nantucket, Norfolk (part), and Plymouth (part)."

2003–2013
All of Barnstable County, Dukes County, Nantucket County,
The following municipalities in Plymouth County: Abington, Carver, Duxbury, Hanover, Hanson Pct. 2, Hingham, Hull, Kingston, Marshfield, Norwell, Pembroke, Plymouth, Plympton, Rockland, Scituate, and
The following municipalities in Norfolk County: Cohasset, Quincy, Weymouth

List of members representing the district

References
General

Specific

 Congressional Biographical Directory of the United States 1774–present

External links

Maps 
 Map of Massachusetts's 10th Congressional District, via Massachusetts Secretary of the Commonwealth

Election results 
 CNN.com 2004 election results
 CNN.com 2006 election results

10
Former congressional districts of the United States
2013 disestablishments in Massachusetts
Constituencies established in 1795
Constituencies disestablished in 2013
1795 establishments in Massachusetts